R&R, R & R, or R and R usually refers to R&R (military), a military abbreviation for "rest and recuperation" or "rest and relaxation". It  may also refer to:

Arts and entertainment 
 "R n' R", a 1987 song by Faith No More from Introduce Yourself
 R&R (EastEnders), a fictional nightclub in EastEnders
 R&R (magazine), a music trade magazine
 R&R (Rare & Remixed), a 2001 compilation album by BT
 "R&R" (Space: Above and Beyond episode)

Organizations 
 R&R Films (disambiguation), several film companies
 R&R Ice Cream, UK-based ice cream manufacturer
 R&R Insurance Services, insurance company in the midwestern United States
 R&R Market, a grocery store in San Luis, Colorado
 R&R Partners, an advertising, marketing, public relations, and public affairs firm
 Refuse & Resist!, an American human rights activist group

See also 
 R&R Colony Ponnathota, a village in Andhra Pradesh, India
 RR (disambiguation)
 RNR (disambiguation)